Yaden is an unincorporated community located in Whitley County, Kentucky, United States.

References

Unincorporated communities in Whitley County, Kentucky
Unincorporated communities in Kentucky